Cher (born 1946) is an American entertainer.

Cher may also refer to:

People with the name

Surname
 Oskar Cher (1913-1942), Estonian communist
 Cheyenne Cher, female professional wrestler from the Gorgeous Ladies of Wrestling

Given name
 Cher Butler (born 1965), American model and actress
 Cher Calvin (born 1974), American news presenter
 Cher Coulter, British celebrity stylist
 Cher Lloyd (born 1993), English singer, rapper
 Cher Ng (born 1972), Singaporean DJ
 Cher Scarlett (born 1984 or 1985), American software engineer, writer, and labor activist
 Cher Strauberry (born 1992), American skateboarder and musician
 Cher van Slobbe (born 1995), Dutch cricketer
 Cher Wang (born 1958), Taiwanese entrepreneur and philanthropist

Characters
 Cher Winters, a fictional character from Hollyoaks
 Cher, the main character in Clueless

Other
 Chér (1966 album)
 Chér (1971 album), later retitled Gypsys, Tramps & Thieves
 Cher (1987 album)
 Cher (TV series), a 1975 television show
 Cher (concert residency), a 2008–2011 concert series
 Cher (department), a department in France
 Cher (river), a river in France
 Cher, Iran, a village in West Azerbaijan Province, Iran
 CHER-FM, a Canadian radio station

See also
 
 
 Sonny & Cher, a pop duo from 1964 to 1975, one of whom was Cher